The Hangover Part II is a 2011 American comedy film produced by Legendary Pictures and distributed by Warner Bros. Pictures. It is the sequel to the 2009 film The Hangover and the second installment in The Hangover trilogy. Directed by Todd Phillips, who co-wrote the script with Craig Mazin and Scot Armstrong, the film stars Bradley Cooper, Ed Helms, Zach Galifianakis, Ken Jeong, Jeffrey Tambor, Justin Bartha, and Paul Giamatti.

It tells the story of Phil, Stu, Alan, and Doug as they travel to Thailand for Stu's wedding. After the bachelor party in Las Vegas, Stu takes no chances and opts for a safe, subdued pre-wedding brunch. Things do not go as planned, resulting in another bad hangover with no memories of the previous night.

Development began in April 2009, two months before The Hangover was released. The principal actors were cast in March 2010 to reprise their roles from the first film. Production began in October 2010, in Ontario, California, before moving on location in Thailand. The film was released on May 26, 2011, and became the highest-grossing R-rated comedy during its theatrical run, but received mixed reviews. 

A third and final installment, The Hangover Part III, was released on May 23, 2013.

Plot

Two years after the events in Las Vegas, Stu Price travels to Thailand for his upcoming wedding to Lauren, his fiancée, along with his three best friends, Doug Billings, Phil Wenneck and Alan Garner. Much to Alan's dismay, they are joined by Lauren's younger brother, a Stanford University scholar named Teddy. At the rehearsal dinner, Lauren's father reveals his disapproval of Stu during a toast. Later that night, Stu hesitantly joins Phil, Doug, Alan and Teddy for a beer. Sitting at a campfire and roasting marshmallows, the group toast to Stu and Lauren's future happiness.

The next day, Phil, Stu and Alan awaken in a dilapidated hotel room in Bangkok with no memory of how they got there. Stu has a face tattoo similar to Mike Tyson's and Alan's head is completely shaved. They meet a chain-smoking capuchin monkey and discover that their old 'friend', Chinese gangster Leslie Chow, followed them to Thailand on Alan's invitation. They cannot find Teddy, discovering only his severed finger. Chow begins to relay the events of the prior night, but he seemingly dies after snorting a line of cocaine. Panicked, the trio disposes of Chow's body in the hotel's ice box.

Through a tip from Doug (who left the campfire earlier and stayed at the resort), they go to a police station to pick up Teddy, but are given a wheelchair containing an elderly Buddhist monk. He refuses to reveal anything, having taken a vow of silence. After finding a business card, they travel to the smoldering ruins of the business.

They enter a nearby tattoo parlor where Stu got his tattoo, and they learn that they started a fight that escalated into a riot. The trio returns the monk to his temple, where they are encouraged by the head monk to meditate. Alan manages to recall that they had been at a strip club, where they learn that Stu engaged in sexual intercourse with a transsexual woman. Upon exiting, the trio is attacked by two Russian mobsters who take the monkey, and one shoots Phil in his arm.

After Phil is treated at a clinic, Alan confesses that he had drugged some of the marshmallows from the previous night with muscle relaxers and his ADHD medication in order to sedate Teddy, as he feared the others were going to replace him, but accidentally mixed up the bags. Phil and Stu become furious that Alan drugged them again. Stu blames Alan for ruining his life and attacks him, but Phil breaks it up and tells them that they have to stick together. They notice something on Alan's stomach: an address and a time for a meeting. They meet a gangster named Kingsley, who demands Chow's bank account password by the following morning in exchange for Teddy. They return to the hotel to try to find Chow's password, only to discover that he is still alive. They steal the monkey, who had the code given to him and put inside his vest for safe-keeping by Chow, back from the Russian mobsters through a violent car chase, during which the monkey is shot and injured.

After taking the code and leaving the monkey outside a veterinary clinic, the group completes the deal with Kingsley the next morning. Interpol agents appear and arrest Chow. Kingsley turns out to be an undercover agent, who tells the trio that he does not actually know where Teddy is.

Desperate, Phil calls Doug's wife Tracy to tell her they cannot find Teddy. Stu decides to call off the wedding, live in Bangkok and say that Teddy died. During a rolling blackout, Stu realizes where Teddy is. The trio rushes back to the hotel to find Teddy who is in the elevator (though is still missing a finger). Teddy had woken up earlier than the others, but became trapped after the power went out when he went to get ice for his finger. The four use Chow's speedboat to travel back to the wedding reception.

Arriving just as Lauren's father is about to cancel the wedding, Stu makes a defiant speech, and rejects being a boring dentist and instead insists he is quite wild. Impressed, Lauren's father gives the couple his blessing. Alan presents Stu with a special gift at the reception: a musical guest performance by Mike Tyson. Teddy later discovers that he had taken many pictures during the night on his cell phone before the battery died. The group, along with Tyson, agree to look at the pictures together once before deleting them.

Cast
 Bradley Cooper as Phil Wenneck, a teacher, and the leader of the Wolfpack
 Ed Helms as Dr. Stu Price, a dentist traveling to Thailand to get married
 Zach Galifianakis as Alan Garner, brother-in-law to Doug, idolizes Phil
 Ken Jeong as Leslie Chow
 Jeffrey Tambor as Sid Garner
 Justin Bartha as Doug Billings
 Paul Giamatti as Kingsley/Detective Peters, an undercover Interpol agent
 Jamie Chung as Lauren Srisai, Stu's fiancée
 Sasha Barrese as Tracy Billings, Doug's wife
 Mason Lee as Teddy Srisai, Lauren's brother
 Gillian Vigman as Stephanie Wenneck, Phil's wife
 Bryan Callen as Samir, a strip club owner in Bangkok
 Sondra Currie as Linda Garner, Tracy's and Alan's mother
 Yasmin Lee as Kimmy
 Nirut Sirijanya as Fong Srisai, Lauren's father
 Penpak Sirikul as Joi
 Crystal the Monkey as The Drug-Dealing Monkey

Mike Tyson reprises his role as himself and sings a cover of the 1984 Murray Head song "One Night in Bangkok" for the movie. The film is the Hollywood debut of Mason Lee, son of director Ang Lee. Nick Cassavetes has a cameo appearance as a Bangkok tattoo artist. Liam Neeson was initially cast in that role, which was originally envisioned for Mel Gibson.

Production

Development and pre-production

In April 2009, Warner Bros. hired Todd Phillips, who directed The Hangover, to write a sequel with Scot Armstrong. The deal, reached two months before the release of The Hangover in June 2009, came as result of The Hangover'''s positive screen tests, and a trailer which drew a strong reaction from audiences at ShoWest. The writers from the first film, Scott Moore and Jon Lucas, decided not to come back to write the sequel because, according to Lucas, "they were done with that story…and didn't want to just write Hangover sequels their whole careers".Variety reported in July 2009, that production on The Hangover 2 would begin in October 2010, for a May 26, 2011 release, following the same production schedule used for the first film. Also in July, Zach Galifianakis stated in an interview with Latino Review that the film will be set in Thailand, "Well, I think we're going to Thailand. The problem with Hangover 2 is that we have to live up to what we did which is very difficult. So we get, I think, kind of kidnapped. It has nothing to do with the bachelor party. We're definitely not doing that again but we do end up in an exotic location. That's all I know".

In January 2010, Phillips dismissed rumors that Zac Efron would join the cast of The Hangover 2, though Ed Helms stated that Efron would be a welcomed addition, commenting, "I love that guy. He's actually really funny".

In March 2010, Phillips denied reports that the film would take place in Mexico or Thailand stating, "I don't know. There's a lot of rumors. There was rumor also that it was going to Mexico or something and neither are true". Also by March, Galifianakis, Helms, Bradley Cooper, and Justin Bartha completed negotiations and signed deals to reprise their roles in the sequel.

Cooper stated that "we made [the] decision early on" to keep the same plot structure. "I remember we did this photo shoot for Vanity Fair and that was when we first talked about a sequel in a realistic way; and we were all in the room together afterwards and we were saying 'here's the choice: do we stray from the structure or do we run straight for it?' And we all agreed, no question about it, we hadn't earned the ability to take these 3 guys out and put them in a new structure. There needs to be a ticking clock, there needs to be a missed night and there needs to be someone who's gone and a woman who is waiting to get married and a guy who needs to get married."

In June 2010, before accepting the Guy Movie of the Year award on the Spike Guys Choice Awards, Phillips announced that there would be a Hangover 2 and that they were hoping to begin filming around October 15, 2010, for a July 4, 2011 weekend release.

In July 2010, it was confirmed that film would indeed be set in Thailand and earlier comments made by Phillips denying such reports were a deliberate case of misdirection. The following month, Bradley Cooper stated he believed the rumors to be true and was looking forward to filming The Hangover 2 in Thailand.

In October 2010, Phillips confirmed that the film would take place in Bangkok and Los Angeles and that Galifianakis, Cooper, Helms and Ken Jeong would be returning.

Filming
On a budget of $80 million, principal photography began on October 8, 2010, in Ontario, California with the first images of production being released a few days later. It was also reported in October that actress Heather Graham would not be reprising her role as Jade from the first film. Later in the same month it was reported that Mel Gibson would have a cameo appearance in the film as a Bangkok tattoo artist. Four days later Warner Bros. Pictures, Legendary Pictures and director Todd Phillips confirmed that Gibson would not be appearing in the film. Phillips stated: "I thought Mel would have been great in the movie and I had the full backing of [WB president] Jeff Robinov and his team. But I realize filmmaking is a collaborative effort, and this decision ultimately did not have the full support of my entire cast and crew."

Liam Neeson replaced Gibson after being invited by Cooper, who worked with Neeson on The A-Team, to take the part. Neeson, a fan of the first film stated, "I just got a call to do a one-day shoot on 'Hangover 2' as a tattooist in Thailand, and that's all I know about it". Gibson was reportedly furious over the decision. A source close to Gibson stated, "He doesn't understand why Mike Tyson, a drug user who turned his life around, was given a chance while Mel was kicked to the curb. Everybody deserves a second chance". Although, Neeson had filmed his scenes, his cameo was edited out when director Todd Phillips was forced to do reshoots and Neeson was not available. He was replaced by Nick Cassavetes.

In November 2010, it was reported that Jamie Chung had been cast in the film as Stu's fiancée as well as it being renamed, The Hangover Part II. In an interview director Todd Phillips revealed that Mike Tyson would be back in the sequel. Also in November, it was reported that Paul Giamatti had joined the cast. The next day it was reported that former U.S. President Bill Clinton filmed a cameo appearance for the film in Bangkok while he was in the city to deliver a speech on clean energy. Ed Helms clarified that Clinton merely visited the set and would be surprised if he appeared in the film.

In December 2010, it was reported that Bryan Callen, who played the owner of the wedding chapel in The Hangover, is working again in The Hangover Part II, as "a smarmy strip club owner in Bangkok". Also in December, Australian stuntman Scott McLean was seriously injured in a traffic accident while filming a stunt sequence near Bangkok. Warner Bros. issued a statement stating McLean was put into a medically-induced coma but is expected to recover.

Bradley Cooper said that "logistically, to get from point A to point B [was] incredibly difficult and the bureaucracy and getting things done. There are always tons of people around the set and Todd loves a lean set and it was always the opposite, so watching a director deal with that—especially when it was Todd Phillips—was interesting." He then went on to say, in a later part of the interview, that "it was the hardest shoot that I had ever done, that Zach had ever done, that Ed had ever done and that Todd had ever done."

Post-production
In February 2011, it was reported that Christophe Beck would be reteaming with director Todd Phillips to score the film. The project marks the fourth collaboration between Beck and Philips, who also worked together on School for Scoundrels, The Hangover and Due Date.

In April 2011, Variety reported that Liam Neeson's cameo as a Bangkok tattoo artist had been accidentally cut and Nick Cassavetes had been re-cast in the role. While editing, Phillips cut the scene that immediately followed Neeson's cameo, meaning it no longer had the information necessary to logically get the main characters to the situation in the next scene. Three weeks later, Phillips decided to reshoot the scene, but with Neeson in London filming Wrath of the Titans, the actor was no longer available. Phillips explained, "We were in a complete time crunch so I called up Nick and asked if he would do the part. He came in and crushed it and that is the scene that you will ultimately see in the film. [I'm excited for everyone] to see the film. It turned out great".

Soundtrack

The soundtrack was released on May 24, 2011, by WaterTower Music. The soundtrack contains 12 songs from the film, along with eight dialogue clips from the film. Though the song "Monster", by Kanye West featuring Jay-Z, Rick Ross, Bon Iver, and Nicki Minaj, was featured in the film, it does not appear on the soundtrack.

Among the songs included on the album is Ed Helms' version of the Billy Joel song "Allentown", rewritten in the spirit of his popular "Stu's Song" from the soundtrack of 2009's The Hangover. Additional music includes a song from Danzig, along with music from the Ska Rangers, Kanye West, Mark Lanegan, Deadmau5, Wolfmother, Billy Joel, and more.

ReleaseThe Hangover Part II held its premiere on May 19, 2011, at Grauman's Chinese Theatre in Hollywood, California.

Marketing
The first teaser trailer was released online in February 2011. The first full trailer was released in April 2011. Later in the same month Warner Bros. pulled the trailer from theaters for violating an MPAA rule stating that films can only trailer before similarly rated movies. The trailer for the R-rated comedy was being promoted at screenings for the PG-13-rated Source Code against MPAA regulations. Warner Bros. released a statement saying, "In our haste to meet the placement schedule for this trailer, we failed to properly vet the final version with the MPAA. We acted immediately to correct the mistake and removed the trailer from screens".

Lawsuits

Tattoo

In the film, Stu wakes up with a copy of Mike Tyson's tattoo. In April 2011, tattoo artist S. Victor Whitmill, who designed and inked Tyson's tattoo, filed a lawsuit against Warner Bros. for copyright infringement, requesting an injunction against using the tattoo in the movie or its promotional materials. Warner Bros. asserted several defenses, including that tattoos are not copyrightable. Judge Catherine D. Perry denied the injunction due to harm to other businesses but allowed the case to go forward, calling most of the arguments put forward by Warner Bros. were "just silly" and affirming the copyrightability of tattoos. Warner Bros. said it would digitally modify the tattoo in the home video release if no agreement was reached; it settled with Whitmill on June 20 under undisclosed terms.

Stuntman
In 2011, Scott McLean, an Australian stuntman who was injured and suffered brain damage while filming in Bangkok sued Warner Bros. The case was settled out of court for an undisclosed sum, though several years later McLean was still fighting Warner Bros, who were disputing ongoing medical costs incurred in treatment for the injuries he sustained at work.

Louis Vuitton luggage
In June 2012, Warner Bros. successfully defended a lawsuit brought against them by Louis Vuitton over the use of a fake case in one scene.

Home mediaThe Hangover Part II was released on DVD and Blu-ray on December 6, 2011, in the United States by Warner Home Video, on December 5 in the United Kingdom and on November 30 in the Netherlands. The film was made available in three formats: DVD, Blu-ray, and a Blu-ray combo pack which included both high- and standard-definition versions of the film and an UltraViolet digital copy of the film.

Reception

Box officeThe Hangover Part II grossed $254.5 million in North America and $332.3 million in other territories for a worldwide gross of $586.8 million, against a budget of $80 million. In its opening weekend, it earned $177.8 million, which was the highest-grossing worldwide opening for a comedy film. On the weekend of June 17–19, 2011, it out-grossed its predecessor in worldwide earnings to become the highest-grossing R-rated comedy of all time.

United States and Canada
The film was released on Thursday, May 26, 2011, in North America, coinciding with the U.S. Memorial Day weekend. During launch midnight showings in 2,600 theaters, the film earned $10.4 million, breaking the record for the biggest midnight opening for an R-rated film, replacing Paranormal Activity (2007) with $6.3 million. The film opened in a further 1,015 theaters during the launch day for a total of 3,615—becoming the widest opening ever for an R-rated film—and earned a further $21.2 million to accrue a launch-day total of $31.6 million; nearly doubling The Hangovers Friday launch opening ($16.7 million). By this point, it had the third-highest Thursday opening of any film, behind The Matrix Reloaded ($37.5 million) and Star Wars: Episode III – Revenge of the Sith ($50 million).

This amount broke two further records; the highest-grossing opening day for a live-action comedy and the highest-grossing opening day for an R-rated comedy film, replacing Sex and the City (2008) with $26.7 million. According to exit polling, the launch day audience was 51 percent female and 41 percent were aged between 18 and 24. On May 27, the film took an additional $30.0 million, dropping only 5 percent from the takings of the previous day and becoming the highest-grossing Friday for a live-action comedy. The three-day (Friday–Sunday) opening weekend accumulated $85,946,294—an average of $23,923 per theater—becoming the highest-grossing opening weekend for a comedy film, the highest-grossing opening weekend for a live-action comedy, replacing Austin Powers in Goldmember ($73 million), the highest-grossing opening weekend for an R-rated comedy, replacing Sex and the City ($79 million) and the second-highest-grossing opening weekend of all time for an R-rated film, after The Matrix Reloaded ($91.7 million).

For the Memorial Day four-day weekend, the film amassed $103.4 million to become the fourth-highest-grossing Memorial Day weekend opening. In its second weekend the film gross dropped 64 percent from the previous weekend—while the original film dropped only 27 percent during its second weekend—and grossed $31.4 million.
The film ended its box office run on September 15, 2011, on 113th day of its release.

International marketThe Hangover Part II debuted in 40 countries internationally over the weekend of May 26–29, 2011, across 5,170 screens. In total, the film accrued $60.3 million from its Friday-through-Monday opening weekend, more than tripling the international gross of The Hangovers debut in the same territories. The highest weekend gross came from the United Kingdom where the film earned £10,409,017 from 469 screens, breaking the record for the highest-grossing opening for a U.S. comedy, but this record was overtaken by The Inbetweeners Movie (£13,216,736). Australia accrued a gross of $12.1 million to replace Sex and the City in the country as the highest-grossing opening for an MA-rated film—no-one under the age of 15 permitted.

The film took $8.7 million in the Netherlands and $6.2 million in France and $3.1 million in Italy ($4.6 million with previews); a five-fold increase over the opening-weekend gross of The Hangover. On its second weekend, the film accrued $63.8 million from 53 territories, placing it second behind Pirates of the Caribbean: On Stranger Tides, the film having earned 79 percent of its predecessor's entire overseas run. On the weekend of June 10–12, 2011, it surpassed its predecessor and There's Something About Mary in international earnings to become the highest-grossing R-rated comedy overseas.

Critical reception
On Rotten Tomatoes the film has an approval rating of 34% based on 247 reviews with an average rating of 4.96/10. The site's critical consensus reads, "A crueler, darker, raunchier carbon copy of the first installment, The Hangover Part II lacks the element of surprise—and most of the joy—that helped make the original a hit." On Metacritic, the film has a score of 44 out of 100 based on 40 critics, indicating "mixed or average reviews". Audiences polled by CinemaScore gave the film an average grade of "A−" on an A+ to F scale.

Andrew Barker of Variety gave the film a negative review, stating, "The stock dismissal 'more of the same' has rarely been more accurately applied to a sequel than to The Hangover Part II, which ranks as little more than a faded copy of its predecessor superimposed on a more brightly colored background". Christy Lemire of the Associated Press said, "Giving the people what they want is one thing. Making nearly the exact same movie a second time, but shifting the setting to Thailand, is just … what, lazy? Arrogant? Maybe a combination of the two". Roger Ebert of the Chicago Sun-Times gave the film two stars out of four stating, "The Hangover Part II plays like a challenge to the audience's capacity for raunchiness. It gets laughs, but some of them are in disbelief".

Conversely, Michael Rechtshaffen of The Hollywood Reporter gave The Hangover Part II a positive review remarking, "What happens in Bangkok isn't as much fun as when it happened in Vegas, but it's still worth the trip". Lou Lumenick of the New York Post said, "There are definitely laughs to be had, even if the three leads often seem to be going through the motions".

Controversy
Crystal, a capuchin monkey who also appeared in the Night at the Museum films, portrays the drug-dealing monkey. Director Todd Phillips raised concerns after he joked that Crystal had become addicted to cigarettes after learning to smoke them for the film. Philips later explained that Crystal never actually held a lit cigarette on the film's set and the smoke was added digitally in post-production. Despite this, PETA protested about Crystal's appearance in the film for use of exotic animals for entertainment purposes and the film does not carry the American Humane Association's disclaimer that "no animals were harmed" since the group was denied set visits.

In an interview with New York'' magazine, Ken Jeong responded to criticisms of the character Mr. Chow as an offensive caricature and stated doing the character was "very cathartic" for him and said the character "has the inflections of Vietnamese, with kind of the anger of my own Korean nature" although "it's definitely not about an accent, or a stereotype."

As the film comes to a close, many photos are revealed depicting the events of the previous night. Among them is a photo which loosely depicts a famous war photo by photographer Eddie Adams of a public execution during the Vietnam War. Film critic Roger Ebert was amongst those who criticized use of the photo, calling it "a cruel shot that director Todd Phillips should never, ever have used."

Accolades

References

External links

 
 
 
 
 

2011 films
2011 black comedy films
2010s buddy comedy films
2010s comedy road movies
American black comedy films
American buddy comedy films
American comedy road movies
American sequel films
Films scored by Christophe Beck
Films about alcoholism
Films about drugs
Films about weddings
Films about missing people
Films directed by Todd Phillips
Films produced by Todd Phillips
Films set in Los Angeles
Films set in Thailand
Films set in Asia
Films shot in Bangkok
Films shot in California
Films shot in Thailand
The Hangover (film series)
Legendary Pictures films
Films with screenplays by Todd Phillips
Films with screenplays by Scot Armstrong
Films about trans women
Animal cruelty incidents in film
Race-related controversies in film
Warner Bros. films
Works subject to a lawsuit
Triad films
2010s English-language films
2010s American films
2010s Hong Kong films
Films with screenplays by Craig Mazin